Gary Edmund Carter (April 8, 1954 – February 16, 2012) was an American professional baseball catcher whose 19-year Major League Baseball (MLB) career was spent primarily with the Montreal Expos and New York Mets.

Nicknamed "the Kid" for his youthful exuberance, Carter was named an All-Star 11 times, and was a member of the 1986 World Series Champion Mets.

Carter was known throughout his career for his hitting, excellent defense, ability to handle pitchers, and on-field leadership. He made clutch contributions to the Mets' World Series championship in 1986, including a 12th-inning single against the Houston Astros which won Game 5 of the NLCS and a 10th-inning single against the Boston Red Sox to start the comeback rally in Game 6 of the World Series.  He is one of only four people ever to be named captain of the Mets, and he had his number retired by the Expos.

After leaving the major leagues, Carter coached baseball at the college and minor-league levels. 

In 2003, he was inducted into the National Baseball Hall of Fame in Cooperstown, New York. Carter was the first Hall of Famer whose plaque depicts him as a member of the Montreal Expos.

Early life
Carter was born in the Los Angeles suburb of Culver City in 1954 to Jim Carter, an aircraft worker, and his wife, Inge. Athletic at a young age, Carter - along with four other boys - won the 7-year-old category of the first national Punt, Pass, and Kick skills competition in 1961. A month after he turned twelve in 1966, his 37-year-old mother died of leukemia. Carter attended Sunny Hills High School in Fullerton, where he played football as a quarterback, baseball as an infielder, and graduated in 1972. He also played American Legion Baseball, and was named the 1971 American Legion Graduate of the Year.

After receiving more than a hundred athletic scholarship offers, Carter signed a letter of intent to play football for the UCLA Bruins as a quarterback, but then signed with the Montreal Expos, after they selected him in the third round (53rd overall) of the 1972 Major League Baseball draft.

Playing career

Montreal Expos
Carter was drafted by the Montreal Expos as a shortstop in the third round of the 1972 Major League Baseball draft. Carter got his nickname "the Kid" during his first spring training camp with the Expos in 1974.

Rookie season
The Expos converted Carter to a catcher in the minor leagues. In 1974, he hit 23 home runs and drove in 83 runs for the Expos' Triple-A affiliate, the Memphis Blues. Following a September call-up, Carter made his major league debut in Jarry Park in Montreal in the second game of a doubleheader against the New York Mets on Monday, September 16. Despite going 0–4 in his debut game, he finished the season batting .407 (11–27). His first major league hits came in both games of an Expos sweep of another doubleheader with the Mets on September 18, as a pinch hitter in the seventh inning of the opener and as the catcher in the nightcap. His first MLB home run came on September 28 against Steve Carlton in a 3–1 victory over the visiting Philadelphia Phillies.

Carter split time between right field and catching during his rookie season (1975), and was selected for the National League All-Star team as a right fielder. He did not get an at bat, but appeared as a defensive replacement for Pete Rose in the ninth inning, and caught Rod Carew's fly ball for the final out of the NL's 6–3 victory.  In that rookie season, Carter hit .270 with 17 home runs and 68 runs batted in, receiving the Sporting News Rookie of the Year Award and finishing second to San Francisco Giants pitcher John Montefusco for the National League Rookie of the Year award. 

That same year he was voted the Expos Player of the Year, which he also won in 1977, 1980, and 1984.

Expos catcher
Carter again split time in the outfield and behind the plate in 1976. Limited to 91 games by a broken finger, he batted just .219 with six home runs and 38 RBIs. In 1977, young stars Warren Cromartie, Ellis Valentine, and Andre Dawson became full-time outfielders. In mid-June, former starting catcher Barry Foote was traded to the Phillies, opening up even more starts for Carter behind the plate. With little time at other positions, he responded with 31 home runs and 84 RBIs.  In 1980, Carter hit 29 home runs, drove in 101 runs, and earned the first of three consecutive Gold Glove Awards. He finished second to third baseman Mike Schmidt in NL MVP balloting, whose Phillies took the National League East by one game over the Expos.

Carter caught Charlie Lea's no-hitter on May 10, 1981, the nightcap of a doubleheader split, during the first half of the strike shortened season.  The season resumed on Sunday, August 9, with Carter playing in the 1981 All-Star Game, his first. His two home runs earned him the game's MVP award, and made him the fifth and most recent player to hit two home runs in an All-Star Game.

MLB split the fractured 1981 season into two halves, with the first-place teams from each half in each division meeting in a best-of-five divisional playoff series. The four survivors moved on to two best-of-five League Championship Series. The Expos won the NL East's second half with a 30–23 record. In his first post-season, Carter batted .421, hit two home runs and drove in six in the Expos' three games to two victory over the Phillies in the division series. Carter's average improved to .438 in the NLCS, with no home runs or RBIs, and his Expos lost to the Los Angeles Dodgers in five games, who won the World Series over the New York Yankees.

Pierre Elliott Trudeau, then prime minister of Canada, once remarked of Carter's popularity saying "I am certainly happy that I don't have to run for election against Gary Carter." However some Expos were put off by Carter's unabashed enthusiasm, feeling that he was too taken with his image and basked in his press coverage too eagerly, derisively naming him "Camera Carter." Andre Dawson felt Carter was "more a glory hound than a team player."

1984 season
Carter hit a home run in the 1984 All-Star Game to give the NL a 2–1 lead that they would not relinquish, earning him his second All-Star game MVP award. Carter's 106 RBIs (an NL lead), 159 games played, .294 batting average, 175 hits and 290 total bases were personal highs.

The 1984 Expos finished fifth in the NL East. At the end of the season, the rebuilding Expos chafed at Carter's salary demands and traded him in December to the Mets for Hubie Brooks, Mike Fitzgerald, Herm Winningham, and Floyd Youmans.

New York Mets

In his first game with New York on April 9, 1985, he hit a tenth-inning home run off Neil Allen to give the Mets a 6–5 Opening Day victory over the St. Louis Cardinals. The Mets and Cardinals rivaled for the National League East championship, with Carter and ex-Cardinal first baseman Keith Hernandez leading NY. The season came down to the wire as the Mets won 98 games but lost the division by three games to the Cardinals. Carter hit a career-high 32 home runs and drove in 100 runs. The Mets had three players finish in the top ten in NL MVP balloting that season (Dwight Gooden 4th, Carter 6th, and Hernandez 8th).

1986 World Series Champions

In 1986, the Mets won 108 games and took the National League East by  games over the Phillies. Carter suffered a postseason slump in the NLCS, batting .148. However, he hit a walk-off RBI single to win Game 5. Carter also had two hits in Game 6, which the Mets won in 16 innings.

The Mets won the World Series in seven games over the Boston Red Sox. Carter batted .276 with nine RBIs in his first World Series, and hit two home runs over Fenway Park's Green Monster in Game Four. He is the only player to hit two home runs in both an All-Star Game (1981) and a World Series game. Carter started a two-out rally in the tenth inning of Game 6, scoring the first of three Mets runs that inning on a single by Ray Knight. He also hit an eighth-inning sacrifice fly that tied the game.  Carter finished third on the NL MVP ballot in 1986.

1987–1988
Carter batted .235 in 1987, and ended the season with 291 career home runs. He had 299 home runs by May 16, 1988 after a fast start, then slumped until August 11 against the Chicago Cubs at Wrigley Field when he hit his 300th. During his home run drought, Carter was named co-captain of the team with Hernandez, who had been named captain the previous season.

Carter ended 1988 with 11 home runs and 46 RBIs—his lowest totals since 1976. He ended the season with 10,360 career putouts as a catcher, breaking the career mark of Detroit Tigers catcher Bill Freehan (9,941).

The Mets won 100 games that season, taking the NL East by 15 games. Heavily favored, they were upset by the Los Angeles Dodgers in the NLCS. Carter batted .183 in 50 games for the Mets in 1989. In November, the Mets released Carter after five seasons, during which he had hit 89 home runs and drove in 349 runs.

After the Mets
Released by the Mets after the 1989 season, Carter subsequently joined the San Francisco Giants.
At age 36, he platooned with catcher Terry Kennedy in 1990, batting .254 with nine home runs. A Los Angeles Dodger in 1991, he found himself again in a pennant race, with LA  finishing one game behind the Atlanta Braves in the National League West.

At the end of the season, Carter returned to Montreal for his final season, obtained off waivers from the Dodgers. Carter was still nicknamed "the Kid" by teammates despite his age. In his last at-bat (in the seventh inning) on September 27, 1992, he hit a double over the head of Chicago Cubs right-fielder and former Expos teammate Andre Dawson. This hit drove in Larry Walker and proved to be the winning hit. After the hit, he was given a standing ovation. The Expos went 87–75 and finished second behind the Pittsburgh Pirates in the National League East.

Career statistics
Over a nineteen-year major league career Carter was an eleven-time All-Star, won three Gold Glove Awards, and five Silver Sluggers. He played in 2,296 games, accumulating 2,092 hits in 7,971 at bats for a .262 career batting average, along with 324 home runs, 1,225 runs batted in, and a .335 on-base percentage. He hit 307 home runs as a catcher, ranking him seventh all-time at the position. His 1,225 career runs batted in also ranks him seventh all-time among major league catchers.

Carter's 2,056 games played as a catcher rank him fourth on the all-time list. He caught 127 shutouts during his career, ranking him sixth all-time among major league catchers in that category. He led National League catchers eight times in putouts, five times in assists and three times in baserunners caught stealing. His 810 baserunners caught stealing are the most for any major league catcher since the end of the dead-ball era, when stolen bases were more prevalent. His 11,785 putouts and 149 double plays during his playing career both rank tenth all-time among major league catchers. 

Carter's .991 career fielding percentage was five points above the league average during his playing career. When he broke the 100 assists barrier in 1977, he joined Johnny Bench and Jim Sundberg as the only major league catchers to have more than 100 assists in a season since the end of the Second World War.

In all, Carter amassed the second highest career WAR for a catcher during his career.

Post-playing career
After his retirement as a player, Carter served as an analyst for Florida Marlins television broadcasts from 1993 to 1996. He also appeared in the movie The Last Home Run (1998) which was filmed in 1996.

Hall of Fame

Carter was elected to the Baseball Hall of Fame in his sixth year on the ballot, on January 7, 2003. He became the first Hall of Famer whose plaque depicts a player with the Montreal Expos logo.  Carter had originally expressed a preference during his final playing season to be inducted wearing an Expos cap. Given the uncertainty of the Expo franchise, Carter's employment by the Mets organization since retiring as a player, his World Series title with the Mets, and his media celebrity during his stint in New York, Carter shifted his preference to be enshrined with a Mets cap after his election to the Hall. The New York City media strongly supported Carter's preference to go into the Hall as a Met. Carter joked that "he wanted his Cooperstown cap to be a half-and-halfer, split between the Expos and Mets". The final decision rested with the Hall of Fame, and Hall president Dale Petroskey declared that Carter's achievements with the Expos over twelve season had earned his induction, whereas his five seasons with the Mets by itself would not have, saying "we want to have represented on the plaque the team that best represents where a player made the biggest impact in his career. When you look at it, it's very clear. Gary Carter is an important part of the history of the Expos." Carter accepted the Hall's decision with grace, stating: "The fact I played 11 years in Montreal and the fact that the majority of my statistics and accomplishments were achieved there, it would be wrong, probably, to do it any other way." At the induction ceremony, Carter spoke some words in French, thanking fans in Montreal for the great honor and pleasure of playing in that city, while also taking great care to note the Mets' 1986 championship as the highlight of his career.

Carter was inducted into the New York Mets Hall of Fame in 2001. While the Mets have not retired number eight, it has remained unused since his election to the Hall of Fame in 2003. In 2001, he was elected into the Canadian Baseball Hall of Fame along with Dave McKay, and his number eight was retired by the Expos. After the Expos moved to Washington, D.C. to become the Washington Nationals following the 2004 season, a banner displaying Carter's number along with those of other Expos stars Andre Dawson, Tim Raines and Rusty Staub was hung from the rafters at the Bell Centre, home of the NHL's Montreal Canadiens. In Washington, D.C., Carter is recognized in the Ring of Honor at Nationals Park.

Coaching

Carter was named Gulf Coast League Manager of the Year his first season managing the Gulf Coast Mets in 2005. A year later, he was promoted to the A-level St. Lucie Mets, and guided his team to the 2006 Florida State League championship, again earning Manager of the Year honors. In more recent years, Carter was criticized, most notably by former co-captain Keith Hernandez, for twice openly campaigning for the Mets' managerial position while it was still occupied by incumbents Art Howe in 2004, and in 2008 Willie Randolph.

In 2008, he managed the Orange County Flyers of the Golden Baseball League, guiding his team to the GBL Championship and was named Manager of the Year. 

For the following season Carter was named manager of the Long Island Ducks of the independent Atlantic League of Professional Baseball. The Ducks won the 2009 second half Liberty Division title, but were defeated by the Southern Maryland Blue Crabs in the Liberty Division playoffs. 

In October 2009, Carter was named head baseball coach for the NCAA Division II Palm Beach Atlantic University Sailfish.

Personal life
Carter met his future wife, Sandy, when she was a student at Fullerton College.  They married in 1975. They had three children.

His daughter Kimmy was the head softball coach at Palm Beach Atlantic University and was a softball catcher for Florida State from 1999 to 2002.

Carter was an active philanthropist, and championed causes that fought leukemia and illiteracy.

The Gary Carter Foundation (of which Carter was the president) supports 8 Title I schools in Palm Beach County whose students live in poverty. Typically, these schools have 90% or more students eligible for free or reduced lunches. The Foundation seeks to "better the physical, mental and spiritual well being of children." To accomplish this, they advocate "school literacy by encouraging use of the Reading Counts Program, a program that exists in the Palm Beach County School District". Since its inception, The Gary Carter Foundation has placed over $622,000 toward charitable purposes, including $366,000 to local elementary schools for their reading programs. 

The 11th edition of the Merriam-Webster's Collegiate Dictionary, published in 2012, credits Carter, who rarely used profanity, with the first recorded use of the term "f-bomb."

Illness and death
In May 2011, Carter was diagnosed with four malignant tumors in his brain after experiencing headaches and forgetfulness. Doctors confirmed that he had a grade IV primary brain tumor known as glioblastoma multiforme. Doctors said that the extremely aggressive cancer was inoperable and Carter would undergo other treatment methods to shrink his tumor. On January 20, 2012, daughter Kimmy posted on her blog that an MRI had revealed additional tumors on her father's brain.  Even as he battled an aggressive form of brain cancer, Carter did not miss Opening Day for the college baseball team he coached.

Carter died on February 16, 2012, at the age of 57. Nine days later, the Mets announced that they were adding a memorial patch to their uniforms in Carter's honor for the entire 2012 season. The patch features a black home plate with the number 8 and "KID" inscribed on it. On the Mets' 2012 opening day, the Carter family unveiled a banner with a similar design on the center field wall of Citi Field.

The NHL's Montreal Canadiens, who had purchased the Expos' mascot Youppi! and hung retired numbers in its arena after the Expos' relocation to Washington, paid tribute to Carter by presenting a video montage and observing a moment of silence before a game against the New Jersey Devils on February 20, 2012. All Canadiens players took to the ice during pre-game warm-ups wearing number 8 Carter jerseys, and Youppi! appeared wearing an Expos uniform. In addition, Youppi! wore a patch on his Canadiens jersey featuring a white circle with a blue number 8 inside it for the remainder of the season.

 
Tom Verducci, longtime Sports Illustrated baseball writer, reminisced about Carter following his death, "I cannot conjure a single image of Gary Carter with anything but a smile on his face. I have no recollection of a gloomy Carter, not even as his knees began to announce a slow surrender ... Carter played every day with the joy as if it were the opening day of Little League." "Gary actually took a lot of grief from his teammates for being a straight arrow. It wasn't the cool thing to do but on the same token, I think he actually served as a role model for a lot of these guys as they aged. He was the ballast of that team. They did have a lot of fun, there's no question about that, but they were also one of the fiercest, most competitive teams I've ever seen and obviously their comebacks from the '86 postseason defines that team. Carter was a huge part of that."

At Carter's memorial service, on February 24, 2012, Expo teammate Tommy Hutton made note of Carter's deep faith. The three loves in Carter's life, Hutton said, were his family, baseball and God.

Faillon Street West in Montreal, near the former Jarry Park stadium, was renamed Gary Carter Street in his honor.

On March 28, 2014, during an exhibition game between the Toronto Blue Jays and the New York Mets at Olympic Stadium in Montreal, Quebec, a banner was unveiled in honor of Carter in a special ceremony before the first pitch. Carter's widow Sandy and daughter Kimmy were present on field for an emotional video tribute and the unveiling of the banner on the outfield wall, which reads "Merci! Thank You!" and contains an image of a baseball overlaid with Carter's retired number 8.

See also

 Canadian Baseball Hall of Fame
 DHL Hometown Heroes
 Gary Carter Stadium

References

Further reading

External links

Gary Carter at SABR (Baseball BioProject)
Gary Carter at Baseball Almanac
Gary Carter at Ultimate Mets Database

Gary Carter Foundation
Leukemia & Lymphoma Society

1954 births
2012 deaths
American Christians
American expatriate baseball players in Canada
American sportsmen
Baseball coaches from California
Baseball players from California
Canadian Baseball Hall of Fame inductees
Deaths from brain cancer in the United States
Deaths from glioblastoma
Florida Marlins announcers
Gold Glove Award winners
Los Angeles Dodgers players
Major League Baseball All-Star Game MVPs
Major League Baseball catchers
Major League Baseball players with retired numbers
Memphis Blues players
Minor league baseball managers
Montreal Expos announcers
Montreal Expos players
National Baseball Hall of Fame inductees
National League All-Stars
National League RBI champions
New York Mets players
People from Culver City, California
People from Palm Beach Gardens, Florida
Peninsula Whips players
Québec Carnavals players
San Francisco Giants players
Silver Slugger Award winners
Tidewater Tides players
West Palm Beach Expos players